Tengiz Anatolyevich Gatikoyev (born 18 August 1970) is a former Russian football player.

External links
 

1970 births
Living people
Soviet footballers
Russian footballers
FC Okean Nakhodka players
Russian Premier League players
FC Kuban Krasnodar players
FC Lada-Tolyatti players
PFC Spartak Nalchik players
FC Armavir players
Association football midfielders
Association football forwards